Inocencio María Yéregui Goichea (28 July 1833 - 1 February 1890) was a Uruguayan cleric.

Upon the death of Bishop Jacinto Vera in May 1881, Yéregui was appointed auxiliary bishop of Montevideo and titular bishop of Canopus. On 22 November 1881 he was finally appointed Bishop of Montevideo.

Bibliography
 Fernández Saldaña, J. M.: Diccionario Uruguayo de Biografías 1810–1940, Adolfo Linardi,  Editorial Amerindia, Montevideo, 1945
 Chiarino, J. V.: Los Obispos de un siglo, conferencia dictada en el Club Católico de Montevideo el 7 de setiembre de 1978, publicada en Libro Annual 1978-1979 del Instituto Teológico del Uruguay, Montevideo, 1979.

References

External links 
 

1833 births
1890 deaths
Uruguayan people of Basque descent
Bishops appointed by Pope Leo XIII
19th-century Roman Catholic bishops in Uruguay
Participants in the First Vatican Council 
Burials at Montevideo Metropolitan Cathedral
Roman Catholic bishops of Montevideo